Ṣa‘ṣa‘ah ibn Suhān was born in the year 598 CE, corresponding to about 24 years before Hijra in Qatif, Saudi Arabia. He was a companion of ‘Alī and is revered by the Shia.

He belonged to the tribe of Abdul Qays. He was a prolific writer, an orator, and brother of Zayd ibn Suhan.

Ṣa‘ṣa‘ah was exiled by Muawiyah I to Bahrain, where he died in 666 CE, corresponding to 44 AH. His grave lies in the village of Askar, and is visited by many Shia Muslims.

References

 Shrine of Sa'sa'a
 
 Biography

Medieval Bahrain
Bahraini Shia Muslims
598 births
666 deaths
Companions of the Prophet